Dorëz may refer to the following places in Albania:

 Dorëz, Elbasan, a village in the municipality of Librazhd, Elbasan County
 Dorëz, Gjirokastër, a village in the municipality of Tepelenë, Gjirokastër County
 Dorëz, Tirana, a village in the municipality of Tirana